Kevin Earley is an American actor and singer.

Biography
Earley was born in Chicago, Illinois, one of four brothers, and attended Mundelein High School in Mundelein, Illinois. He trained at the Webster Conservatory of Webster University in the St. Louis, Missouri metro-area where he earned his B.F.A. in 1994. He is married to Julie Ann Emery.

Kevin was cast as Ernest Defarge in the Broadway musical adaptation of A Tale of Two Cities which opened for preview on August 19, 2008 at the Al Hirschfeld Theatre in New York.

Theatre Credits
 Sweeney Todd: The Demon Barber of Fleet Street, Sweeney Todd (2018)
 Guys and Dolls, Sky Masterson (2018)
 Jesus Christ Superstar, Pontius Pilate (2017)
 The Secret Garden, Lord Archibald Craven (2015)
 The Pirates of Penzance, The Pirate King (2012)
 Death Takes a Holiday, Death / Prince Nikolai Sirki (2011) - Off-Broadway
 Oklahoma, Jud Fry (2010)
 Into the Woods, The Wolf / Cinderella's Prince (2009)
 Les Misérables, Enjolras (2009)
 1776, Thomas Jefferson (2009)
 A Tale of Two Cities, Ernest Defarge (2008) - Broadway
 Hello, Dolly!, Cornelius Hackl (2008)
 Anything Goes, Billy Crocker
 Camelot, Sir Sagramore (2005) - Hollywood Bowl
 Thoroughly Modern Millie, Trevor Graydon (2003–2004) - Broadway
 My Fair Lady, Freddy Eynsford-Hill (2003) - Hollywood Bowl
 The Music Man, Ewart Dunlop (2002) - Hollywood Bowl
 1776, Edward Rutledge (2001) - Concert
 Les Misérables, Enjolras (1999-2000) - 3rd US National Tour
 Les Misérables, Lesgles / Constable / Enjolras (u/s) (1998) - Broadway
 Assassins, Balladeer (1996)

Film and television
 Girlfriends, Guest Star (2006), UPN
 Imagine That (Pilot), Host, Disney / Love Letters Ltd.
 Pre -K, Opera Man, Dir. Thomas Ian Griffith
 Opus 4, Starring Role, Premier Films
 Ten Commandments (DVD), Ramses (2006), BCBG Ent. (Live at the Kodak Theatre)

Recordings
 Earley Standards, Solo CD, Midlothian Road Productions Inc.
 Ripper (Original Cast), Chester, Nelsen Productions Inc.
 Rarities, Rogers and Heart, Bygone Records

References

External links
 A Tale of Two Cities, talemusical.com 
 
 
 Kevin Earley, abouttheartists.com

1970s births
American male stage actors
American male television actors
American male musical theatre actors
Webster University alumni
American male singers
Living people
Year of birth missing (living people)
Male actors from Chicago
21st-century American male actors